Leistus ferrugineus is a species of ground beetle native to the Palearctic and the Nearctic.

References

External links
Global Biodiversity Information

Nebriinae
Beetles described in 1758
Taxa named by Carl Linnaeus
Beetles of Europe